The 2018 Mountain West Conference women's basketball tournament was held from March 5-9, 2018 at the Thomas & Mack Center on the campus of University of Nevada, Las Vegas, in Las Vegas, Nevada. The winner of the tournament received an automatic bid to the 2018 NCAA tournament. The 2017 tournament, saw Boise State defeat Fresno State 66-53 to receive an automatic bid to the 2017 NCAA tournament.

Seeds
Teams are seeded by conference record, with a ties broken by record between the tied teams followed by record against the regular-season champion, if necessary.

Schedule

Bracket

Source:

See also
 2018 Mountain West Conference men's basketball tournament

References

Mountain West Conference women's basketball tournament
2017–18 Mountain West Conference women's basketball season
College sports tournaments in Nevada